The 1982 Gilbey's Gin season was the 4th season of the franchise in the Philippine Basketball Association (PBA).

Transactions

Summary
Gilbey's Gin has signed up former Presto import Lew Massey from last season as their reinforcement in the Reinforced Filipino Conference. The Gins finish third behind San Miguel Beer and Crispa after 18 games in the elimination phase, they were swept in two games by U/Tex Wranglers in their best-of-three quarterfinal series.

Massey return in the Open Conference, together with new recruit Rickey Brown, a Portland Trail Blazers third round draft pick in 1977, who was replaced after three games by Larry McNeill, the Gins resident import for the past three years. Gilbey's were tied with N-Rich Coffee on top of the standings with 13 wins and 5 losses and advances to the semifinal round outright.

Finals stint
The high-scoring duo of Massey and McNeill led Gilbey's to their first championship appearance in four years of participation. On December 7, Gilbey's escape with a 102-101 win over San Miguel Beermen to gain first entry in the title playoffs. N-Rich and Toyota dispute the second finals seat in a playoff match won by the Super Corollas. 

Gilbey's got swept in three games by the powerhouse Toyota ballclub in the finals series.

Scoring record
March 25: Lew Massey surpass the previous all-time one-game scoring record of 75 points set by Harry Rogers in 1976 while playing for 7-Up by tallying 85 points, converting 36-of-70 attempts from the field in Gilbey's 123-126 loss to Crispa. Massey scored 23, 16, 24 and 22 in each of four quarters.

Won-loss records vs Opponents

Roster

References

Barangay Ginebra San Miguel seasons
Gilbey's